Bełcz Mały is a village in the administrative district of Gmina Wąsosz, within Góra County, Lower Silesian Voivodeship, in south-western Poland.

It lies approximately 5 km north-west of Wąsosz, 13 km south-east of Góra, and 57 km north of the regional capital Wrocław.

References

Villages in Góra County